The 115 MW El Arrayán is the largest wind farm in Chile. At the time of its inauguration in 2014, it was the largest in Latin America.

Background 
The site is approximately 400 km north of Santiago in the coastal town of Ovalle, which is the capital of the Limarí Province, in the Coquimbo Region. The project consists of 50 Siemens 2.3 MW wind turbines. It completed in June 2014 and officially went into service in August 2014. Pattern Energy owns 70% of the facility, which it also operates. Antofagasta Minerals SA owns the remaining 30% minority stake.

References

Wind farms in Chile
Renewable energy in Chile
2014 establishments in Chile
Energy infrastructure in Coquimbo Region